Variable dwarf kingfisher is a common name of a group of kingfishers in the genus, Ceyx.

The variable dwarf kingfisher (Ceyx lepidus or Alcedo lepidus) formerly included 15 subspecies. A molecular phylogenetic study published in 2013 found that most of the insular subspecies had substantially diverged from one another. The variable dwarf kingfisher was therefore split and 12 of the subspecies were promoted to species status. At the same time the name of the variable dwarf kingfisher was changed to the Moluccan dwarf kingfisher.

The species in the group are:

 Moluccan dwarf kingfisher, Ceyx lepidus
 Dimorphic dwarf kingfisher,  Ceyx margarethae
 Sula dwarf kingfisher,  Ceyx wallacii
 Buru dwarf kingfisher,  Ceyx cajeli
 Papuan dwarf kingfisher,  Ceyx solitarius
 Manus dwarf kingfisher,  Ceyx dispar
 New Ireland dwarf kingfisher,  Ceyx mulcatus
 New Britain dwarf kingfisher,  Ceyx sacerdotis
 North Solomons dwarf kingfisher,  Ceyx meeki
 New Georgia dwarf kingfisher,  Ceyx collectoris
 Malaita dwarf kingfisher,  Ceyx malaitae
 Guadalcanal dwarf kingfisher,  Ceyx nigromaxilla
 Makira dwarf kingfisher,  Ceyx gentianus

References

Birds by common name